Mikhail Petrenko (born 1976 in St. Petersburg, Russia) is an opera singer who sings bass.

Career
Highlights in the 2013–14 season included: a return to the Metropolitan Opera for Prince Galitsky (Prince Igor) and Netherlands Opera for Gounod's Faust. He also sang the role of Grand Inquisitor (Don Carlo) for the Verbier Festival. In January 2015, Petrenko returned to the Metropolitan Opera in the title role of a new production of Bluebeard's Castle. He has also performed in concerts with the Bamberger Symphoniker, Finnish Radio Symphony Orchestra, and Swedish Radio Symphony Orchestra.

Roles that Petrenko has performed include:
Ruslan (Ruslan and Lyudmila)
Konchak, Prince Galitzky (Prince Igor)
Prince Gremin (Eugene Onegin)
King René (Iolanta)
Pimen, Boris Godunov (Boris Godunov)
Prince Ivan Khovansky (Khovanshchina)
Prince Nikolai Bolkonsky, Marshal Davout (War and Peace)
Malyuta Skuratov (The Tsar's Bride)
Leporello (Don Giovanni)
Bass (stage version of Verdi's Requiem)
King Marke (Tristan und Isolde)
Daland (Der fliegende Holländer)
King Heinrich (Lohengrin)
Fafner (Das Rheingold, Siegfried )
Hunding (Die Walküre)
Hagen (Götterdämmerung)
Klingsor, Titurel (Parsifal)
Hans Sachs (Die Meistersinger von Nürnberg)

In November 2011, he performed the role of Ruslan (Ruslan and Lyudmila) at the reopening of Moscow's historic Bolshoi Theatre.

Filmography
Metropolitan Opera Live in HD
Bluebeard's Castle (2015) ... Bluebeard
Prince Igor (2014) ... Prince Galitsky
Boris Godunov (2010) ... Pimen
Götterdämmerung (2013 TV movie) ... Hagen
Don Giovanni Juan (2010) ... Leporello
Otello (2008 TV movie) ... Lodovico
Benvenuto Cellini (2007 TV movie) ... Pope Clemens VII

References

External links
Mikhail Petrenko at Operabase
Mikhail Petrenko at Mariinsky Theatre
Jennifer Melink, "Coming of Age", Opera News (February 2014)
Mikhail Petrenko at Opera Online

1976 births
Russian basses
Operalia, The World Opera Competition prize-winners
Living people
Singers from Saint Petersburg
21st-century Russian male opera singers